The Cosmonauts Sea (More Kosmonavtov; sometimes misspelled Cosmonaut Sea) was a proposed sea name as part of the Southern Ocean, off the Prince Olav Coast and Enderby Land, Antarctica, between about 30°E and 50°E. It would have an area of . It would be bordered by two other proposals from a 2002 International Hydrographic Organization (IHO) draft, a Cooperation Sea to the east, and to the west a Riiser-Larsen Sea.

The Cosmonauts Sea , which was named in 1962 by the Soviet Antarctic Expedition in honor of the world's first cosmonauts and the beginning of crewed space exploration era. The name first appeared as a Russian proposal  to the IHO in the IHO 2002 draft.  This draft was never approved by the IHO (or any other organization), and the 1953 IHO document remains currently in force.  Leading geographic authorities and atlases do not use the name, including the 2014 10th edition World Atlas from the United States' National Geographic Society and the 2014 12th edition of the British Times Atlas of the World, though state-issued maps created by the Soviet Union and the Russian Federation do.

The water here is close to freezing throughout the year and is mostly covered by ice. Between 1973 and 1986, several polynyas have occurred in these waters, with the totally enclosed Cosmonaut polynya attaining a maximum size on July 25, 1980, with an open water area of as much as 137,700 km2. This polynya lasted for several weeks before disappearing on August 16, 1980.

References 

Seas of the Southern Ocean
Antarctic region